Dmitry Anatolyevich Pevtsov (born July 8, 1963) is a Russian actor, Member of the State Duma from Medvedkovo constituency of Moscow from 2021, member on New People political party.

Biography
Pevtsov was born in Moscow. He has Russian Jewish ancestry and his grandfather was executed by the NKVD in 1938.

Political Views
On September 17–19, 2021, under the motto "not only a national actor, but also a national candidate", he was elected as an independent deputy to the State Duma, Russia's federal legislative assembly. Later became a member of the New People fraction of the party.

In October 2021, Pevtsov was confirmed as first deputy chairman of the State Duma Committee on Cultural Affairs.

Pevtsov identified the support of the institution of the family, the opening of a new version of the law on culture, the distribution of a network of youth cultural schools and development centers, and lowering the retirement age as his priorities in the post of deputy.

Previously, the actor has repeatedly advocated a ban on abortion, foreign social networks and populating people's private lives in them, demanded censorship in the arts and criminal liability of rap singers for the diabolical tone of their songs.

<blockquote>I am absolutely proud supporter of Putin. I watch what is happening in the country for a long time already - I am 53 years old. In 1991 I already understood everything well. And I see how the country has changed since 2000, when Putin came. I do not compare the two persons, but ... Nicholas II wrote into the column "profession" in some inquiry: "The Master of the Russian land". Today, the so-called liberal intelligentsia reminds me of the people that ultimately led to the murder of the king in 1918. They are engaged in everything but themselves. And one must begin with the question: what am I? what have I done for my country to become better? What am I, a sinless angel, to pound the government so righteously? 
I'm deeply convinced that for the first time in 70 years we've got a professional manager, who really works for the state. And, mind you, weekly confesses and takes Communion. I know that for sure! And it tells me a lot. True Orthodox person can not do evil. Even if he is engaged in such a slippery thing [as politics]. Leading Russia is daunting. But everywhere, at all performances, including in front of students, I say: we live in a country that has risen from its knees. We are stronger, and we are feared and hated by some - take a scandal with our Olympians. They want to ruffle, to provoke us. We annoy them. We grow stronger. In contrast, Europe is falling apart. And America - a colossus on feet of clay. This is what I feel about policy today. Although a few years ago, I was on the side of that part of intelligentsia, which since Soviet times fights with the authorities. It is a bad habit! </blockquote>On 18 March 2022, Pevtsov spoke at Vladimir Putin's Moscow rally celebrating the annexation of Crimea by the Russian Federation from Ukraine and justifying the 2022 Russian invasion of Ukraine. In April and May 2022, Pevtsov participated in a series of concerts organized in order to support the invasion.

Selected filmography

Films
 1986 -   End of the World, followed by a symposium 1990 - Mother 1990 - The Witches Cave 1990 - His Nickname Is Beast 1998 - Contract with Death1999 – Tonkaya Shtuchka2005 – Dead Man's Bluff 2005  - The Turkish Gambit2005 - Popsa  2006 - Carnival Night 2, or fifty years later 
 2007 - Artistka2007 - Election Day2007 - Snow Angel2008 - Guilty Without Guilt2011 - Boris GodunovTelevision series
1996 - Queen Margot1997 - The Countess de Monsoreau2000 – Bandit Petersburg (The Attorney)
 2005 - The Fall of the Empire 2006 - The First Circle2009 - "sniper. weapon of retaliation"
2013 - Einstein. Theory of love2014 - ShipGame shows
2002 – Last Hero 2'' (host)

References

External links

  

1963 births
Living people
Russian male actors
European Film Awards winners (people)
Russian television presenters
Recipients of the Order of Honour (Russia)
Honored Artists of the Russian Federation
State Prize of the Russian Federation laureates
Russian racing drivers
Russian Academy of Theatre Arts alumni
Russian male television actors
Male actors from Moscow
Jewish Russian actors
Eighth convocation members of the State Duma (Russian Federation)
21st-century Russian politicians
Russian actor-politicians